Sir Philip Edward Pilditch, 1st Baronet (12 August 1861 – 17 December 1948), was a British architect and Unionist politician.

Early life
Born in Compton, Plymouth, he was the eldest son of Philip John Pilditch and Emma Rosa Pilditch (née Willmott).

He was educated at Cheveley Hall, Mannamead and at King's College London.

Career
Pilditch was active in the Conservative Party, and stood unsuccessfully at St Ives at the 1906 general election and at Islington East in December 1910.

In 1907 Pilditch was elected to the London County Council, representing Islington East. He was a member of the Conservative-backed Municipal Reform Party which took control of the council from the Progressive Party which was allied to the Liberal Party. The Islington seat was marginal, and at the next council elections in 1910 he was returned for the safer electoral division of Strand. He held the seat in 1913 and remained on the council until 1919. He was a prominent member of the council, and served as vice-chairman in 1913–1914.

Pilditch held a commission in the 1st Sussex Volunteer Artillery, retiring with the rank of captain. During the First World War he was active in the raising of fifty battalions for the New Army in Surrey, Middlesex and London, and acted as honorary treasurer for the battalion funds.

Pilditch was elected to the House of Commons at the 1918 general election becoming the first Member of Parliament for the new constituency of Spelthorne in Middlesex. He held the seat at successive elections until he stood down in 1931. He had a great interest in the preservation of ancient monuments, helping to pilot the Ancient Monuments Act 1931 through parliament. He was also involved in the preservation of the Elizabethan architecture of his home town and served as the president of the Old Plymouth Society.

He was knighted in 1918 and created a baronet, "of Bartropps in the parish of Weybridge in the County of Surrey" in 1929.

Death
He died at his home near Weybridge, Surrey in December 1948, aged 87. He was succeeded in the baronetage by his son, Philip Harold.

Personal life
In 1888 he married Emily Mary Lewis, the daughter of a director of the National Provincial Bank. The couple had two sons and a daughter, Mabel Emily who married Major Henry Hammick. He established the business of Pilditch and Chadwick, surveyors and architects, of which he was head.

References and sources
References

Sources
Kidd, Charles, Williamson, David (editors). Debrett's Peerage and Baronetage (1990 edition). New York: St Martin's Press, 1990.

External links 
 

1861 births
1948 deaths
Alumni of King's College London
Baronets in the Baronetage of the United Kingdom
Knights Bachelor
Members of London County Council
Conservative Party (UK) MPs for English constituencies
UK MPs 1918–1922
UK MPs 1922–1923
UK MPs 1923–1924
UK MPs 1924–1929
UK MPs 1929–1931
Municipal Reform Party politicians
People from Plymouth, Devon